Eilts is a surname. Notable people with the surname include:

 Dieter Eilts (born 1964), German footballer
 Hermann Eilts (1922–2006), United States Foreign Service Officer and diplomat
 Roger and Leo Eilts, members of the band Spontaneous Combustion